Gundry is a surname. People with the surname include:

Inglis Gundry (1905–2000), English composer, novelist, musicologist, music pedagogue and writer
Nathaniel Gundry (1701?–1754), English lawyer and politician
Robert H. Gundry (born 1932), American scholar and retired professor of New Testament studies and Koine Greek
Steven Gundry, American doctor and author

See also
Gundry Sanitarium, a medical institution established in 1900
Grundy (disambiguation)